Broadcasting System of San-in, Inc.  (BSS, 株式会社山陰放送) is a Japanese radio station and TV station broadcast in Tottori Prefecture and Shimane Prefecture.

It is affiliated with Japan Radio Network (JRN), National Radio Network (NRN) and Japan News Network (JNN).

Head office
1-1-71, Nishi-Fukuhara, Yonago, Tottori Prefecture

Broadcasting

Radio
BSS Radio
 Yonago JOHF 900 kHz
 Tottori JOHL 1431 kHz; 92.2 MHz FM ("flagship station")
 Kurayoshi 1557 kHz
 Izumo 1431 kHz
 Ota 1485 kHz
 Hamada JOHM 1557 kHz
 Masuda JOHN 1431 kHz

TV
BSS Television
 Matsue JOHF-TV 10Ch
 Tottori 22Ch
 Kurayoshi 56Ch
 Hamada 5Ch
 Ota 1Ch
 Masuda 26Ch
 Gotsu 44Ch
 Okinoshima 39Ch
 Kamo 8Ch
 Misumi 46Ch etc ...

Supplement
Although this broadcasting station belongs to JNN/JRN/NRN, it was also once associated with Asahi Shimbun. Therefore, on BSS radio, the Asahi Shimbun news of independence work are broadcast during the morning.  That key stations differ on radio and television Since the system of the area of the television station opened from the second half of the 1950s to the second half of the 1960s was 1 prefecture 1 wave in principle when beginning television broadcasting of this broadcasting station, In Tottori Prefecture in which Nihonkai TV (日本海テレビ) which had already begun broadcast at this time exists, it is because its service cannot be started, but it is Shimane Prefecture which had not prepared the television station yet then and its service was to be started first. And already, the request of a start of television broadcasting was replied to Tottori Prefecture, and Tottori Prefecture has also started television broadcasting at last in September, 1972.  Simultaneous broadcast of the program besides the series which Nihonkai TV, such as a "morning news show" and Doraemon, and San-in Chuo TV (山陰中央テレビ) are treating to one time in television broadcasting till September, 1989 might be carried out also by BSS.

Program

Radio
 Ongaku no Kazaguruma
 Moritani Kana's Hakidasa NIGHT!
 Gogo ha dokidoki! etc ...

TV
Music Station (produced by TV Asahi) 
 Saturday Raw egg
 Teleport San-in etc ... 
 Kamen Rider Series (produced by TV Asahi)
 Pretty Cure (produced by ABC)

External links
 BSS HomePage

Japan News Network
Radio in Japan
Television stations in Japan
Radio stations established in 1954
Television channels and stations established in 1959
Companies based in Tottori Prefecture